Portrait of Maffeo Barberini (c. 1598) is a painting by the Italian Baroque master Michelangelo Merisi da Caravaggio. It is in a private collection in Florence.

Barberini, 30 years old and from the eminent Florentine Barberini family, was a rapidly rising Church prelate, a friend of Caravaggio's patron Cardinal Francesco Maria Del Monte, and himself a poet and patron of the arts.  Barberini's support would continue into later years – in 1603 he commissioned a Sacrifice of Isaac from Caravaggio. In 1623 he became Pope as Urban VIII.

See also
List of paintings by Caravaggio

References 
 Creighton Gilbert. Caravaggio and his two cardinals. Penn State Press, 1995.

External links

1590s paintings
Paintings by Caravaggio
Barberini, Maffeo
Barberini
Pope Urban VIII